William A. Smith or William Alexander Smith may refer to:

William Alden Smith (1859–1932), U.S. Representative from the U.S. state of Michigan
William Alexander Smith (politician) (1828–1888), U.S. Representative from the U.S. state of North Carolina
Sir William Alexander Smith (Boys' Brigade) (1854–1914), founder of the Boys' Brigade
William Alexander Smith (boxer) (1904–1955), South African boxer
Amor De Cosmos (William Alexander Smith, 1825–1897), Canadian journalist and politician
William Andrew Smith (1802–1870), president of Randolph-Macon College
William Armstrong Smith, political researcher whose papers reside in the Richard B. Russell Library for Political Research and Studies
William Arthur Smith (1918–1989), American artist
William A. Smith (Iowa judge) (1870–1958), justice of the Iowa Supreme Court
William A. Smith (Kansas judge) (1888-1968), Associate Justice of the Kansas Supreme Court

See also
William Smith (disambiguation)